As of July 2016, the International Union for Conservation of Nature (IUCN) listed 195 critically endangered insect species, including 46 which are tagged as possibly extinct. Of all evaluated insect species, 3.2% are listed as critically endangered. 
The IUCN also lists two insect subspecies as critically endangered.

No subpopulations of insects have been evaluated by the IUCN.

Additionally 1702 insect species (28% of those evaluated) are listed as data deficient, meaning there is insufficient information for a full assessment of conservation status. As these species typically have small distributions and/or populations, they are intrinsically likely to be threatened, according to the IUCN. While the category data deficient indicates that no assessment of extinction risk has been made for the taxa, the IUCN notes that it may be appropriate to give them "the same degree of attention as threatened taxa, at least until their status can be assessed".

This is a complete list of critically endangered insect species and subspecies as evaluated by the IUCN. Species considered possibly extinct by the IUCN are marked as such.

Earwigs

Hemiptera

Blattodea

Orthoptera
There are 72 species in the order Orthoptera assessed as critically endangered.

Euschmidtiids

Crickets

Acridids

Tettigoniids

Other Orthoptera species

Hymenoptera

Lepidoptera

Beetles

Odonata

Species

Subspecies
Chlorogomphus brunneus keramensis
Delphi cordulegaster (Cordulegaster helladica kastalia)

Other insect species

See also 
 Lists of IUCN Red List critically endangered species
 List of least concern insects
 List of near threatened insects
 List of vulnerable insects
 List of endangered insects
 List of recently extinct insects
 List of data deficient insects

References 

.01
Insects
Critically endangered insects
Critically endangered insects
Critically endangered insects